Johann Nepomuk Ender (3 November 1793 Vienna – 16 March 1854 Vienna) was an Austrian portrait painter and engraver.

Biography
He spent several years studying at the Academy of Fine Arts, Vienna, where he had his debut with his canvas depicting the death of Marcus Aurelius. which won an award. Although he developed his own style, his works show the obvious influence of his contemporary, Jean-Baptiste Isabey.

In 1818, Count István Széchenyi invited Ender to accompany him on a trip to Greece and Italy. Ender accepted, and brought back a large number of sketches that he turned into oil paintings. During the trip, he also made contacts which later enabled him to stay at the Accademia di San Luca in Rome.

After returning, in 1826, he settled in Vienna and worked as a freelance artist. From 1829 to 1850, he was a teacher at the Academy. He created numerous copper engravings and religious art, but earned most of his living by painting portraits. He worked on it from 1850 to 1852.

His twin brother, Thomas, and son Eduard were also painters. In 1922, a street in Vienna's Meidling district was named for them.

Works
Among his works are:

 “Madonna with Slumbering Christ Child” (Vienna Museum)
 “Marcus Aurelius on His Death Bed” (1814, Esterhazy Gallery)
 “The Crucifixion”, his masterpiece (a fresco in the Vienna Cathedral)
 “Orestes Pursued by the Furies” (1815)
 “Minerva Showing Ithaca to Ulysses” (1816)
 “Assumption” (1817)
 “Sleeping at Christ's Sepulchre” (1817)
 “Judith” (exhibited in 1824)
 “Miguel I of Portugal” (1827) (in the Queluz Palace)
 “From Darkness, the Light” or “Allegory of the Hungarian Academy of Sciences” (1831)
 “Bacchus Finding Ariadne”

Sources

External links

 
 
 Web Gallery of Art, image collection, virtual museum, searchable database of European fine arts (1100-1850)

1793 births
1854 deaths
19th-century Austrian painters
19th-century Austrian male artists
Austrian male painters
Academic staff of the Academy of Fine Arts Vienna
Artists from Vienna
19th-century painters of historical subjects